The 2014 mayoral election in Jackson, Mississippi took place on April 22, 2014. It was necessitated after the death of incumbent mayor Chokwe Lumumba. Councilman Tony Yarber defeated the late Lumumba's son Chokwe Antar Lumumba in a runoff. Other candidates in the race included former mayor Harvey Johnson, Jr., city council members Melvin Priester and Margaret Barrett-Simon, and state senator John Horhn.

Results

References

2014 United States mayoral elections
Mayoral elections in Jackson, Mississippi